Mohammed Salim Basindawa ( born 4 April 1935) is a Yemeni politician who was Prime Minister of Yemen from 10 December 2011 to 24 September 2014.

Career
Born in Aden, Basindawa served as Minister of Foreign Affairs from 1993 to 1994. He was a member of Yemen's ruling party, but resigned in the early 2000s to join the opposition to President Ali Abdullah Saleh as an independent.

In November 2011, following months of unrest, Basindawa was nominated by the Yemeni opposition to lead the first government after the ouster of President Saleh. On 27 November 2011, he was named Prime Minister by Vice President Abdrabbuh Mansur Hadi. He and the members of his cabinet were sworn in on 10 December 2011.

On 31 August 2013, Basindawa narrowly escaped an assassination attempt when gunmen opened fire on his convoy.

On 21 September 2014, Basindawa resigned as Prime Minister on the same day that Houthi rebels captured Sana'a, the capital of Yemen. On 24 September, Abdullah Mohsen al-Akwa began acting prime minister.

References

|-

1935 births
Living people
People from Aden
People of the Yemeni Revolution
Prime Ministers of Yemen
21st-century Yemeni politicians
20th-century Yemeni politicians
21st-century prime ministers of Yemen
Foreign ministers of Yemen